Albert Andrew Watrous (February 1, 1899 – December 3, 1983) was an American professional golfer who played on the PGA Tour in the 1920s and 1930s.

Early life
Born in Yonkers, New York, of Polish descent, Watrous moved to Michigan at an early age and played on the first two Ryder Cup teams in 1927 and 1929. Watrous was the club pro at Oakland Hills Country Club in Bloomfield Hills, Michigan, for 37 years. Watrous had tremendous success in Michigan events, winning the Michigan PGA Championship nine times and the Michigan Open six times.

1926 Open Championship
Watrous never won a major championship, but came very close in the 1926 Open Championship at Royal Lytham & St Annes Golf Club. Playing with Bobby Jones in the final round, and tied with him, Watrous hit the green in two shots on the difficult par-4 17th hole, with Jones in trouble after his tee shot finished in sandy dunes and tall grass far left of the fairway. But from this very difficult position, Jones hit one of the greatest recovery shots in golf history from 175 yards, as his ball finished on the green nearer than Watrous', who three-putted, and finished second to Jones. Watrous did win the PGA Seniors Championship three times after he turned 50.

Legacy and death
On June 14, 1979, Watrous was inducted into the National Polish-American Sports Hall of Fame and Museum. In 1982, he was inducted with the charter class at the Michigan Golf Hall of Fame. A collegiate golf tournament named in his honor, the Al Watrous Memorial Intercollegiate Invitational, was first played in 2009.

Watrous died on December 3, 1983, in Royal Oak, Michigan.

Professional wins

PGA Tour wins (8)
1922 (1) Canadian Open
1925 (2) South Central Open, Corpus Christi Open
1927 (1) one win
1929 (1) one win
1932 (2) Mid-South Open (tie with Henry Picard and Al Houghton), Mid-South Bestball (with Tommy Armour)
1933 (1) Lakeland Open

Source

Other wins
Note: This list is probably incomplete.
1922 Michigan PGA Championship
1924 Michigan PGA Championship
1926 Michigan Open
1927 Michigan Open
1929 Michigan Open
1930 Michigan Open
1932 Michigan PGA Championship
1936 Michigan PGA Championship
1938 Michigan PGA Championship
1939 Michigan PGA Championship
1941 Michigan PGA Championship
1943 Michigan Open
1949 Michigan Open
1952 Michigan PGA Championship, Michigan Pro-Am
1954 Michigan PGA Championship, Michigan Pro-Am

Senior wins
1950 PGA Seniors' Championship
1951 PGA Seniors' Championship
1953 Michigan PGA Senior Championship
1954 Michigan PGA Senior Championship
1956 Michigan PGA Senior Championship
1957 PGA Seniors' Championship, Michigan PGA Senior Championship, World Senior Championship
1961 Michigan PGA Senior Championship

Results in major championships

NYF = tournament not yet founded
NT = no tournament
WD = withdrew
CUT = missed the half-way cut
R64, R32, R16, QF, SF = round in which player lost in PGA Championship match play
"T" indicates a tie for a place

Summary

Most consecutive cuts made – 23 (1926 Open Championship – 1937 Masters)
Longest streak of top-10s – 2 (1929 Open Championship – 1929 PGA)

See also
List of golfers with most PGA Tour wins

References

American male golfers
PGA Tour golfers
Ryder Cup competitors for the United States
Golfers from Michigan
American people of Polish descent
Sportspeople from Yonkers, New York
1899 births
1983 deaths